The 2018 St. George Illawarra Dragons season was the 20th in the joint venture club's history. The Dragons competed in the NRL's 2018 Telstra Premiership season.

Gains And Losses of Squad 2018

Players

Source:

Ladder progression

Bold – Opposition's Home game
X – Bye
* – Golden point game
Opponent for round listed above margin

Season Results

Source:

Source:

References

St. George Illawarra Dragons seasons
St. George Illawarra Dragons season
2018 NRL Women's season